The Biela (German name) or Bělá or Ostrovská Bělá (Czech names) is a river in eastern Germany and northern Czech Republic, a left tributary of the Elbe. The source is near Ostrov hamlet in the municipality of Tisá, in the Bohemian Switzerland, northwest of Děčín. After a few km it crosses into Saxony (and the Saxon Switzerland). The town Königstein is located at the confluence of the Biela with the Elbe.

See also
List of rivers of Saxony
List of rivers of the Czech Republic

Rivers of the Ústí nad Labem Region
Rivers of Saxony
International rivers of Europe
Elbe Sandstone Mountains
Bodies of water of Saxon Switzerland
Rivers of Germany